Gamefam is an American video game publisher and is the first professional company to utilize Roblox as a video game development platform.

History
Gamefam was founded in 2019 in Los Angeles, California, United States by Joe Ferencz, the current CEO. Ferencz was originally involved with bringing Hot Wheels into the Forza series and Rocket League, and while doing so, he was observing Roblox'''s success as a free-to-play video game platform. Explaining his reason for founding Gamefam, Ferencz told TechCrunch “Roblox truly is the Metaverse for this younger generation. What that means is that each game needs to have a very distinctive and attractive immersion to it, in a way that mobile free-to-play doesn’t." The company is described by Ferencz as the “first and only fully-dedicated, professional game publishing company on Roblox.”

In November 2020, Gamefam partnered with Mattel to develop Hot Wheels Open World on Roblox, which is a Hot Wheels-themed open world racing game.

In October 2021, Gamefam partnered with WowWee to create toys for their popular Roblox game Twilight Daycare.

In November 2021, Gamefam announced in an interview with Forbes partnered with WildBrain to start integrating various brands into their portfolio of Roblox titles.

In March 2022, Gamefam announced they have raised $25 million in its Series A funding round, which was led by Konvoy Ventures and participated in by Play Ventures, Makers Fund, Bessemer Venture Partners and Galaxy Interactive.

In the same month, Gamefam also partnered with Sega to develop Sonic Speed Simulator on Roblox, which is a Sonic-themed game. The game peaked at over 350,000 concurrent users with overall positive feedback.

In December 2022, former employees accused Gamefam of crunching their employees while underpaying them, as well as laying some off without much warning, which was against the contract. Gamefam has released a statement denying this.

Games
Gamefam's current games include:

 All Star Tower Defense, a round based Tower Defense game inspired by anime characters
 Build to Survive Simulator, a round based survival game
 Car Dealership Tycoon, a car dealership based tycoon game
 Deathrun, a round based obstacle game
 Deliveryman Simulator, a delivery-based simulator.
 Easy Obby, an obstacle-based game.
 Eating Simulator, a round based tower parkour game
 Funky Friday, a Friday Night Funkin' inspired game.
 Gym Tycoon, a gym based tycoon game
 Hot Wheels Open World, a licensed Hot Wheels open world racing game
 Junkbots Story, a licensed Hexbug story game based on one of their franchises, JunkBots.
 Little World, an insect adventure game
 Military Tycoon, a military shooter game which lets players build their own military base.
 War Tycoon, a military shooter game that uses the Advanced Combat System framework which lets players build their own military base.
 PolyBattle, a first-person shooter
 Red Light, Green Light, a game based on the popular Netflix drama series Squid Game RoBeats, a rhythm game
 Shoot Out, a western-themed third-person shooter
 Slashing Simulator, a weapon-based simulator in which involves the use of katanas.
 Sonic Speed Simulator, a licensed SEGA game based on their most popular franchise, Sonic the Hedgehog.
 He-Man and the Masters of the Universe: You Have The Power!, a licensed Mattel game based on one of their most popular franchises, Masters of the Universe.
 Speed Run Simulator, a speed-based simulator game.
 Starving Artists, a NFT inspired game where players can create their own pixel art and sell it to other players
 Tower of Misery, a round based tower parkour game
 Twilight Daycare, a daycare roleplaying game
 Ultimate Driving, an open world racing game based in the Eastern United States
 Workout Island'', a weight lifting simulation game

References

American companies established in 2019
Privately held companies based in California
Video game companies of the United States